Anthon Frederikssen is a Greenlandic politician and the leader of the Kattusseqatigiit Party. He was previously the Minister for Domestic Affairs, Nature and Environment.

References

Living people
Association of Candidates politicians
Government ministers of Greenland
Year of birth missing (living people)